The year 1774 in architecture involved some significant events.

Buildings and structures

Buildings

 Hammond-Harwood House in Annapolis, Maryland, designed by William Buckland is begun and largely completed before the architect's death, the only surviving example of American colonial architecture based on a design by Palladio.
 Original construction of Château de Bénouville in Normandy, designed by Claude Nicolas Ledoux is completed.
 Royal Crescent in Bath, England, designed by John Wood, the Younger is completed.
 Dundas House in New Town, Edinburgh, Scotland, designed by William Chambers, is completed.
 Gatcombe Park in Gloucestershire, England is completed (much later and after reconstruction the private country home of Anne, Princess Royal).
 Clifton House, Belfast in the north of Ireland, a poorhouse designed by Mr Cooley, is opened.
 Włodawa Synagogue in Poland is completed.
 Basilica church of Santissima Annunziata Maggiore, Naples, designed by Luigi Vanvitelli and completed by his son Carlo, is consecrated.
 Ermita de Santa Ana overlooking Chiclana de la Frontera in the Spanish province of Cádiz, designed by Torcuato Cayón, is completed.
 Monastery of San Francisco, Lima, Peru, consecrated in 1673, is completed.
 Construction of Real Felipe Fortress at Callao near Lima, Peru, begun to the design of Louis Godin in 1747, is concluded.
 Vaults and choir of Vannes Cathedral in Brittany are completed.
 English Bridge over the River Severn in Shrewsbury, England, designed by John Gwynn, is completed.
 Marble Bridge at Tsarskoye Selo in Russia is erected.
 Work ceases on the Palace of Versailles in France.

Births
 April 29 – David Hoadley, American architect (died 1839)
 November 8 – Robert Reid, Scottish royal architect (died 1856)
 Late(?) – David Laing, English architect (died 1856)
 James O'Donnell, Anglo-Irish architect working in North America (died 1830)
 1774/5 – William Atkinson, English Gothic country house architect (died 1839)

Deaths
 January 9 – Jacques-François Blondel, French architect and teacher (born 1705)
 January 28 – Antonio Galli Bibiena, Italian architect (born 1700)
 June 20 – Joshua Kirby, English landscape painter, engraver, writer, topographical draughtsman and architect (born 1716)
 October 15 – Prince Dmitry Ukhtomsky, chief architect of Moscow (born 1719)
 November/December – William Buckland, English-born architect in the American colonies (born 1734)
 Francesco Maria Preti, Italian Baroque architect (born 1701)

References

Architecture
Years in architecture
18th-century architecture